Hypselobarbus carnaticus, also known as the Carnatic carp, is a species of cyprinid fish from the Western Ghats in India where it inhabits riffles and larger pools in rapidly flowing rivers and streams. It prefers to shelter underneath boulders and overhangs. It is a commercially important fish and is also farmed.

References

Fish of Asia
Fish described in 1849
Taxobox binomials not recognized by IUCN